Bento is a single-portion takeout or home-packed meal common in several cuisines.

Bento may also refer to:

People
Bento (name), a Portuguese given name or surname

Arts, entertainment, and media
Ben-To, a Japanese light novel, manga and anime series created by Asaura
Bento, a science fiction fanzine edited by David D. Levine and Kate Yule
Bento Books, an American independent book publisher
 Bento, the name of the second Keyboard Cat

Computing and technology
Bento (database), a database application for Mac OS X made by FileMaker Inc.
Bento, the former name of an OpenDoc compound document file format
Bento, a project to extend the Second Life skeleton with new bones and attachment points.
Bento Note, a laptop-tablet hybrid, aka convertible laptop, in a modular design

See also
Benthos, the community of organisms which live on, in, or near the seabed